Deccani Souls is a 2012 art film written and directed by Kaz Rahman. It tells the story of three characters: Hamza, a traveller from an unknown land; Babu, a census collector and Siddiq, an Urdu poet struggling with writer's block as they wander through Hyderabad and are unknowingly connected by the history of Operation Polo.

Cast

Production
The film was shot in Hyderabad and Bidar in India and in Ontario, Canada.

The details of Operation Polo mentioned in the film are taken from the Sunderlal report.

Screenings
Deccani Souls was screened at The Hollywood Theater in Pittsburgh, USA. on 14 June 2012. It was screened at the Transmissions Film Festival in New Delhi, India and was later screened to public at Cochin, Thrissur, Kozhikode, Hyderabad and Mumbai.

The film was screened as part of the 31st Three Rivers Film Festival in Pittsburgh, USA in November 2012.

References

External links
 
 Documenting the Invisible: An Interview with Kaz Rahman
 Hyderabad: A Journey through 'Deccani Souls'

2012 films
Canadian drama films
Films set in Hyderabad, India
Films about Indian Canadians
2010s Canadian films